Miss Earth Venezuela 2008, or Sambil Model Venezuela 2008, was held on June 5, 2008 in Centro Sambil Caracas, Caracas, Venezuela. The winner was María Daniela Torrealba, and represented Venezuela in the Miss Earth 2008 beauty pageant, in Angeles City, Philippines on November 9, 2008, and classified in Top 8 finalists. She also won the special prize Best in Long Gown.

Results
Sambil Model / Miss Earth Venezuela 2008: María Daniela Torrealba
Miss Continente Americano Venezuela 2008: Andrea Matthies
1st Runner-up: Osmariel Villalobos
2nd Runner-up: María Laura Verde
3rd Runner-up: Rosa Elena Zambrano

Awards
Miss Internet: Solange Romero
Miss Press: Andrea Matthies
Miss Elegance: Mónica Pallota
Best Body: Yulimar Roa Medina
Sambil Model Caracas: María Daniela Torrealba
Sambil Model Maracaibo: Osmariel Villalobos
Sambil Model Margarita: VANESSA RATA
Sambil Model Valencia: Mónica Pallota
Sambil Model Barquisimeto: María Laura Verde
Sambil Model San Cristóbal: Yulimar Roa Medina

Contestants

 Andrea Martínez (Maracaibo)
 Andrea Matthies (Caracas)
 Angélica León (Barquisimeto)
 Daniela Arellano (San Cristóbal)
 Dayana Andara (Margarita)
 Gabriela Graff-Stillfried (Caracas)
 Janet Solórzano (Valencia)
 Johanna Gardrat (Margarita)
 María Daniela Torrealba (Caracas)
 María Laura Verde (Barquisimeto)
 Osmariel Villalobos (Maracaibo)
 Mileidys Tarrá (Caracas)

 Mónica Pallota (Valencia)
 Noelia Cabaña (Barquisimeto)
 Paola Colmenares (San Cristóbal)
 Paola Gómez (Maracaibo)
 Veronica Urdaneta (Carupano)
 Rosa Elena Zambrano (Maracaibo)
 Silvia Ramírez (San Cristóbal)
 Solange Romero (Caracas)
 Sorlandia Marín (San Cristóbal)
 Vanessa Knobelsdorff (Valencia)
 Vanessa Terracciano (Barquisimeto)
 Yulimar Roa Medina (San Cristóbal)

References

External links
 Miss Earth / Sambil Model Venezuela Official Website
 Miss Earth Official Page

Miss Earth Venezuela
2008 beauty pageants
2008 in Venezuela